Zack Morris (born 2 October 1998) is an English actor, known for portraying the role of Keegan Baker in the BBC soap opera EastEnders.

Early life and education
Originally from Brentwood, Essex, Morris grew up wanting to be an actor. He developed an interest in acting at age six after seeing a local production, and began acting classes. Morris attended the D&B Academy of Performing Arts in Bromley, where he trained in singing, dancing and acting. He received a scholarship from television presenter Marvin Humes.

Career
Morris began his professional acting career at the age of nine when he appeared in the musical Joseph and the Amazing Technicolor Dreamcoat. He also appeared in the play Cat on a Hot Tin Roof, and in a West End production of Oliver! Morris made his on-screen debut in 2011 as Sam in the miniseries The Fades, and a year later, he played Kyle in the BBC miniseries One Night. He has also appeared in several commercials.

In 2017, Morris was cast as Keegan Baker in the BBC soap opera EastEnders. He left the series after five years in March 2022. Morris is set to star in Will Gilbey's thriller Jericho Ridge. In October 2022, Morris was cast in Disney+'s live-action remake of the horror series Goosebumps.

Filmography

Awards and nominations

References

External links
 

1998 births
Living people
English male soap opera actors
English male child actors
Alumni of Arts University Bournemouth
Male actors from Essex
People from Essex
21st-century English male actors